"All About Lovin' You" is a song by American rock band Bon Jovi. It was released as the fourth single from the band's eighth studio album, Bounce (2002).

Music video
The music video for "All About Lovin' You" continues the story of Jack (portrayed by Tom Sandoval) and Jill (portrayed by Rachel Nichols), the young couple from the "Misunderstood" music video. The video begins with Bon Jovi playing in a large room in a New York building, as Jack jumps off the roof of the same building while Jill watches below. Memories of his relationship with her, including his infidelity seen in the beginning and ending (most notably in the uncut version) of the previous video, flashes before him as he falls. As a crowd gathers in shock, Jack releases a parachute with the words "Will You Marry Me?" written on the inside of the parachute, aimed as a proposal to Jill below. He lands safely and they embrace, giving the presumption that she agreed to the proposal.

Track listings
CD
 "All About Lovin' You" (Jon Bon Jovi, Richie Sambora, Desmond Child, Andreas Carlsson) - 3:45
 "All About Lovin' You" (Acoustic) (Jon Bon Jovi, Richie Sambora, Andreas Carlsson) - 3:37
 "Postcards From the Wasteland" (Demo) (Jon Bon Jovi, Richie Sambora, Billy Falcon) - 5:08
 "All About Lovin' You" (CD-ROM Video)

DVD
 "All About Lovin' You" (Music Video) - 3:46
 "Alive" (Demo) - 3:54
 "Everyday" (Demo) - 2:56
 "All About Lovin' You" (Making of the Video)

Charts

References

2002 songs
2003 singles
Bon Jovi songs
Music videos directed by Marc Klasfeld
Songs written by Andreas Carlsson
Songs written by Desmond Child
Songs written by Jon Bon Jovi
Songs written by Richie Sambora
Song recordings produced by Rob Cavallo
Island Records singles